Wrestling Society X (WSX) is a short-lived American professional wrestling promotion and professional wrestling-based television series created in 2006 by Big Vision Entertainment. The weekly television series formerly aired on MTV, MTV2, MTV Tr3s, and over a dozen other MTV outlets throughout the world. WSXtra, an extra program featuring WSX matches and interviews not broadcast on television, was available on the promotion's MTV website and Video on Demand.

WSX was presented as a secret society of wrestling that used a venue referred to as the WSX Bunker, complete with an artificially worn-out looking ring for its matchups. In matches held within this venue, falls count anywhere was the stipulation. The program also stood out due to its unorthodox approach to pro wrestling; this included frequent use of highly expressive plants, crowd sound effects, electrical sound effects, visual effects, and camera shaking when a wrestler would fall prey to electrical weapons. Along with wrestling, WSX featured musical guests playing at the start of each television broadcast, with some band members joining the broadcast team (consisting of Kris Kloss and Bret Ernst) after the performance.

History
The WSX pilot was taped on February 10, 2006, in Los Angeles, California, and all wrestlers present were forced to sign an agreement stating that they would take part in a full season if the show was picked up by MTV. Delirious was not used at the taping due to his refusal to sign the agreement, as it would have prevented him from working for Total Nonstop Action Wrestling. On July 8, 2006, MTV commissioned the promotion to produce a full season of episodes for their network, and WSX taped its first season of shows between November 11 and November 16, 2006, in Los Angeles, California. The tapings were booked by head writer Kevin Kleinrock, Cody Michaels and Vampiro.

The series premiered January 30, 2007, on MTV. It originally aired Tuesdays at 10:30 p.m. ET, to compete with the second half of ECW on Sci Fi. The WSX Championship was the only title featured and defended on the program, but announcer Kris Kloss hinted (towards the end of the series) at the arrival of WSX Tag Team Championships in the future during tag team matches and on the unaired season finale it was announced the creation of an X Division-style title for the second season. The fourth episode of the series was pulled by MTV after a spot featuring Ricky Banderas throwing a fireball at Vampiro was deemed unairable by the network, but would air in edited form on February 27, 2007. On February 28, 2007, it was announced that Wrestling Society X had been canceled by MTV.

A marathon of new episodes 5–9 aired on March 13, 2007, as MTV later announced that the marathon served as the season finale of WSX and was quietly removed from its scheduled slot on March 20 on MTV. A 10th episode which was set to be the original season finale never aired on television but was later released on the Wrestling Society X: The Complete First (and Last) Season DVD.

Episodes

MTV aired unadvertised previews of the first two episodes the Friday before they premiered at 11:00 pm ET. Prior to WSX debuting, this timeslot normally averaged a 0.10 rating. The first preview episode on January 26 drew a 0.43 rating, while the second preview episode on February 2 drew 0.50. MTV discontinued preview airings beginning with the third episode in hopes of maximizing ratings for the Tuesday broadcasts.

Home video
Wrestling Society X: The Complete First (and Last) Season DVD was released on November 13, 2007. The set features all 10 episodes, all 10 WSXtra episodes, deleted scenes and special features. All of the musical performances were edited out of the DVD set. Also on the DVD were scenes already recorded for the second season, including a season opener WSX Title Match between Ricky Banderas and Youth Suicide in a scaffold match and a feud between Nic Grimes and Mickie Knuckles.

WSX Championship

The WSX Championship was the only professional wrestling title in the short-lived promotion. A ten-man WSX Rumble, which aired on January 30, 2007, was held to decide the participants in the first WSX Championship match, with 6-Pac and Vampiro winning. On November 11, 2006 (aired February 6, 2007), Vampiro defeated 6-Pac with a Tombstone Piledriver inside an exploding coffin to become the first WSX Champion. Rick Banderas defeated Vampiro on November 15, 2006 (aired March 14, 2007) with a Chokeslam into an exploding coffin wrapped in barbed-wire to win the WSX Championship. The promotion closed in March 2007, and Banderas was stripped of the championship on June 17, 2007. Statistically, Banderas held the title the longest.

A WSX Rumble match starts out as a Royal Rumble match and when all the participants have arrived, the match then becomes a Ladder match.

Roster

See also

List of professional wrestling television series

References

External links
 WSX.mtv.com – Official website
 MySpace.com/WrestlingSocietyX – Official MySpace
 IWantMyWSX.com – Ticket information
 ProWrestlingPress.com – Interview with Co-creator Houston Curtis
  – Wrestling Society X DVD on Amazon
 
 

 
American professional wrestling television series
2007 American television series debuts
2007 American television series endings
MTV original programming
Professional wrestling in Los Angeles
Independent professional wrestling promotions based in California